David N. Greenlee (born June 3, 1943) is an American diplomat who served as the U.S. Ambassador to Paraguay between July 19, 2000 and January 15, 2003 and Ambassador to Bolivia between January 17, 2003 and May 10, 2006.

Early life
David Nicol Greenlee was born on June 3, 1943 in White Plains, New York. Greenlee graduated from Yale University in 1965. Greenlee served in the Peace Corps between September 1965 and September 1967. Greenlee served in the United States Army between 1968 and 1971, with the rank of a First Lieutenant, being deployed to Vietnam between September 1969 and September 1970.
Greenlee received the Bronze Star Medal and Vietnam Service Medal while serving in the army.

Diplomatic career
Greenlee entered the United States Foreign Service in 1974. From 1987 to 1989 he served as Deputy chief of mission to Bolivia. From 1989 to 1992 he served as Deputy chief of mission to Chile. From 1992 to 1995 he served as Deputy chief of mission to Spain. From July 19, 2000 to January 15, 2003 Greenlee served as the United States Ambassador to Paraguay. From January 17, 2003 to May 10, 2006, Greenlee served as the United States Ambassador to Bolivia.

References

1943 births
Living people
Ambassadors of the United States to Bolivia
Ambassadors of the United States to Paraguay
Clinton administration personnel
George W. Bush administration personnel
People from White Plains, New York
Yale University alumni